This is a list of companies in the Chicago metropolitan area. The Chicago metropolitan area – also known as "Chicagoland" – is the metropolitan area associated with the city of Chicago, Illinois, and its suburbs. With an estimated population of 9.4 million people, it is the third largest metropolitan area in the United States and the region most connected to the city through geographic, social, economic, and cultural ties.

Architecture and engineering

 Adrian Smith + Gordon Gill Architecture (Chicago)
 AECOM (Chicago)
 Collins Engineers (Chicago)
 Cordogan Clark & Associates (Chicago)
 CTLGroup (Skokie)
 Graham, Anderson, Probst & White (Chicago)
 Hedrich Blessing Photographers (Chicago)
 Holabird & Root (Chicago)
 Kirkegaard Associates (Chicago)
 Krueck and Sexton Architects (Chicago)
 Lucien Lagrange Architects (Chicago)
 Nagle Hartray Architecture (Chicago)
 Perkins+Will (Chicago)
 Primera Engineers (Chicago)
 Skidmore, Owings & Merrill (Chicago)
 SmithGroup (Chicago)
 Solomon Cordwell Buenz (Chicago)
 Studio Gang Architects (Chicago)
 UrbanLab (Chicago)
 Wiss, Janney, Elstner Associates, Inc. (Northbrook)

Construction
 Bulley & Andrews (Chicago)
 Edward Hines Lumber Company (Buffalo Grove)
 Great Lakes Dredge and Dock Company (Oak Brook)
 James McHugh Construction Co (Chicago)

Real estate

 Baird & Warner (Chicago)
 Brookfield Properties (Chicago)
 CenterPoint Properties (Oak Brook)
 Cushman & Wakefield (Chicago) 
 EQ Office (Chicago)
 Equity Residential (Chicago)
 Fordham Company (Chicago)
 JMB Realty (Chicago)
 Jones Lang LaSalle (Chicago)
 Magellan Development Group (Chicago)
 Strategic Hotels & Resorts (Chicago)
 Ventas (Chicago)

Consumer

Consumer goods

Apparel and accessories
 Acme Boots, a unit of Double-H Boots (Chicago)
 Chicago Embroidery Company (Chicago)
 Claire's (Hoffman Estates)
 Hartmarx (Chicago)
 Horween Leather Company (Chicago)
 Islamica (Chicago)
 Oxxford Clothes (Chicago)

Gifts and collectables
 Bradford Exchange (Niles)
 Enesco (Itasca)
 International Star Registry (Ingleside)
 LifeGem (Chicago)
 Recycled Paper Greetings (Chicago)

Home furnishings and equipment

 BRK Brands, Inc. (Aurora), a subsidiary of Newell Brands
 First Alert (Aurora)
 Chamberlain Group (Elmhurst)
 Chicago Faucet (Des Plaines)
 Chicago Lock (Chicago)
 Design Toscano (Elk Grove Village)
 Fortune Brands Home & Security (Deerfield)
 Haeger Potteries (East Dundee)
 Rust-Oleum (Vernon Hills)
 Serta (Hoffman Estates)
 Walter E. Smithe (Itasca)

Household goods
 Crate & Barrel (Northbrook, Illinois)
 Hearthware Home Products (Libertyville)
 Pactiv (Lake Forest)
 Pampered Chef (Addison)
 Reynolds Group Holdings (Lincolnshire)
 Solo Cup Company (Lake Forest), a subsidiary of Dart Container
 Thermos L.L.C. (Schaumburg)
 Turtle Wax (Willowbrook)
 Weber-Stephen Products (Palatine)

Music equipment
Bein & Fushi (Chicago)
 Lyon & Healy (Chicago)
 Marshall USA (Buffalo Grove), a subsidiary of Marshall Amplification
 Shure Incorporated (Niles)
 Souldier
 Specimen Products (Chicago)
 U.S. Music Corporation (Buffalo Grove)
 Universal Audio (Evanston)

Personal care
 Avlon Industries (Melrose Park)
 Blistex, Incorporated (Oak Brook)

Tools
 Klein Tools (Lincolnshire)
 SK Hand Tools (Sycamore)
 Vaughan (Hebron)

Education and reference

 Academy Chicago Publishers – one of the oldest independent publishers in Chicago
 Adtalem Global Education (Chicago)
 BarBri (Chicago)
 Career Education Corporation (Hoffman Estates)
 DeVry University (Naperville)
 Encyclopædia Britannica, Inc. (Chicago)
 Follett Corporation (River Grove)
 Kendall College, LLC (Chicago)
 PrepMe (Chicago)
 Rand McNally (Skokie), a subsidiary of Quebecor World
 Replogle (Chicago)
 Riverside Publishing (Rolling Meadows)
 Tribeca Flashpoint Media Arts Academy (Chicago)
 World Book Encyclopedia (Chicago)
 WyzAnt (Chicago)

Retail

Art supplies
 Blick Art Materials (Highland Park)

Broadlines
 Sears Holdings Corporation (Hoffman Estates)
 SuperValu Pharmacies (Franklin Park)
 Walgreens Boots Alliance (Deerfield)
 Walgreen Company (Deerfield)

Business-to-business
 CDW (Vernon Hills)
 McMaster-Carr (Elmhurst)
 Orderzone.com (Chicago)
 W. W. Grainger (Lake Forest)

Electronics
 Abt Electronics (Glenview)

Florists
 Florists' Transworld Delivery (FTD) (Downers Grove)

Grocery/convenience
 Aldi Inc. (Batavia), a subsidiary of Aldi
 Clark Brands (Naperville)
 IGA (Chicago)
 Jewel-Osco (Itasca), a subsidiary of Albertsons
 Patel Brothers (Hanover Park)
 Peapod (Skokie), a subsidiary of Ahold Delhaize
 Road Ranger (Rockford)

Hardware
 Ace Hardware (Oak Brook)
 True Value (Chicago)
 Val-Test Distributors (Schaumburg)

Office supplies and stationery
 ACCO Brands (Lake Zurich)
 Cartridge World (Spring Grove), a subsidiary of Suzhou Goldengreen Technologies Ltd
 Essendant (Deerfield)
 Fellowes, Inc. (Itasca)
 Paper Source (Chicago)
 Quill Corporation (Lincolnshire) a subsidiary of Staples, Inc.
 Sanford L.P. (Oak Brook), a subsidiary of Newell Brands

Softlines
 Bucketfeet (Chicago)
 Claire's Stores (Hoffman Estates)
 Crate & Barrel (Northbrook)
 The Land of Nod (Northbrook)
 The Pampered Chef (Addison)
 Threadless (Chicago)
 Ulta (Bolingbrook)

Services
 The Care of Trees (Wheeling)
 Disaster Kleenup International (Wood Dale)
 Empire Today (Northlake)
 Leslie Hindman Auctioneers (Chicago)
 Midas (Itasca), a subsidiary of TBC Corporation

Sports, games, and toys

 Bally Total Fitness (Chicago)
 Big Monster Toys (Chicago)
 Brunswick Corporation (Lake Forest)
 Cards Against Humanity (Chicago)
 FASA (Chicago)
 International Pool Tour (Hinsdale)
 Kenzer & Company (Waukegan)
 Killerspin (Chicago)
 Mayfair Games (Skokie)
 Radio Flyer (Chicago)
 Revell (Elk Grove Village)
 Riddell (Des Plaines)
 SRAM Corporation (Chicago)
 Stern (Melrose Park)
 TDC Games (Itasca)
 Ty Inc. (Westmont)
 Wilson Sporting Goods (Chicago), a subsidiary of Amer Sports Corporation
 Wirtz Corp. (Chicago)
 Zizzle (Bannockburn)

Energy
 Coskata (Warrenville)
 DuPont Danisco (Itasca)
 Exelon (Chicago)
 Integrys Energy Group (Chicago)
 New Power Generation International
 Nicor (Naperville)
 NiSource (Merrillville)
 UOP LLC (Des Plaines)

Financial services

Banks

 Alliant Credit Union (Chicago)
 Amalgamated Bank of Chicago (Chicago)
 BankFinancial FSB (Olympia Fields)
 BMO Harris Bank (Chicago)
 First American Bank (Elk Grove Village)
 First Midwest Bancorp (Itasca)
 Northern Trust (Chicago)
 Pacific Global Bank (Chicago)
 Urban Partnership Bank (Chicago)

Credit and payments

 Avant (Chicago)
 Braintree (Chicago)
 Discover Financial Services (Riverwoods)
 E-Loan (Rosemont)
 Feefighters (Chicago)
 Guaranteed Rate (Chicago)
 HSBC Finance, a subsidiary of HSBC (Mettawa)
 SVM (Des Plaines)
 TransUnion (Chicago)

Exchanges

 Chicago Board Options Exchange (Chicago)
 Chicago Stock Exchange (Chicago)
 CME Group (Chicago)
 Nadex (Chicago)
 OneChicago (Chicago)
 Options Clearing Corporation (Chicago)
 U.S. Futures Exchange (Chicago)

Insurance

 Allstate (Northfield Township)
 Arthur J. Gallagher & Co. (Itasca)
 Bankers Life (Chicago)
 Blue Cross Blue Shield Association (Chicago)
 CNA Financial (Chicago) (an affiliate of Loews Corporation)
 Combined Insurance (Chicago)
 Eagle Insurance (Chicago)
 Health Care Service Corporation (Chicago)
 Hub International (Chicago)
 Kemper Corporation (Chicago)
 Kemper Direct
 Old Republic International (Chicago)
 Safeway Insurance Group (Westmont)

Investments

 Ariel Investments (Chicago)
 Calamos (Naperville)
 Chicago Options Associates (Chicago)
 Gardner Rich & Co (Chicago)
 Harris Associates (Chicago)
 Henry Crown and Company (Chicago)
 Incapital (Chicago)
 Lincoln International (Chicago)
 Mesirow Financial (Chicago)
 Morningstar, Inc. (Chicago)
 Nuveen Investments (Chicago)
 PTI Securities & Futures (Chicago)
 William Blair & Company (Chicago)

Private equity and hedge funds

 Chicago Growth Partners (Chicago)
 Citadel LLC (Chicago)
 CIVC Partners (Chicago)
 Frontenac Company (Chicago)
 GCM Grosvenor (Chicago)
 GETCO (Chicago)
 GTCR (Chicago)
 Guggenheim Partners (Chicago)
 Lake Capital (Chicago)
 Lightbank (Chicago)
 Madison Dearborn Partners (Chicago)
 Magnetar Capital (Evanston)
 MK Capital (Chicago)
 RCP Advisors (Chicago)
 TransMarket Group (Chicago)
 Willis Stein & Partners (Chicago)
 Wind Point Partners (Chicago)

Food and beverages

Beverages

 5 Rabbit Cervecería (Bedford Park)
 A.J. Canfield Company (Chicago)
 Argus Brewery (Chicago)
 Baderbräu (Chicago)
 Beam Suntory (Chicago)
 Culligan (Rosemont)
 Goose Island Brewery (Chicago)
 Half Acre Beer Company (Chicago)
 Intelligentsia Coffee & Tea (Chicago)
 Koval Distillery (Chicago)
 Metropolis Coffee Company (Chicago)
 Metropolitan Brewing (Chicago)
 MillerCoors (Chicago)
 Pabst Brewing Company (Woodridge)
 Pipeworks Brewing (Chicago)
 Tropicana Products (Chicago)
 Two Brothers Brewing (Warrenville)

Distribution

 Central Grocers Cooperative (Joliet)
 Chicago International Produce Market (Chicago)
 Eby-Brown (Naperville)
 Republic Tobacco (Glenview)
 Reyes Holdings (Rosemont)
 Topco Associates (Elk Grove Village)
 US Foods (Rosemont)

Food

 Allen Brothers (Chicago)
 Bernard Food Industries (Evanston)
 Budlong Pickle Company (Chicago)
 Cloverhill Bakery (Chicago)
 Colonial Ice Cream (St. Charles)
 Conagra Brands (Chicago) 
 Doumak (Elk Grove Village)
 Fannie May, a unit of 1-800-Flowers (Chicago)
 Ferrara Candy Company (Forest Park)
 Glanbia (Chicago)
 Glanbia Performance Nutrition (Downer's Grove)
 Hannah Banana Bread Company (Glencoe)
 Hillshire Brands (Chicago)
 Jays Foods (Chicago)
 Jel Sert (West Chicago)
 Kraft Heinz (Chicago and Pittsburgh, Pennsylvania)
 Kraft Foods Group, Inc. (Northfield)
 Mead Johnson Nutrition (Glenview)
 Mondelez International (Deerfield)
 Oberweis Dairy (North Aurora)
 Parker House Sausage Company (Chicago)
 Plochman's (Manteno)
 Quaker Oats Company, a unit of PepsiCo (Chicago)
 Strom Products (Bannockburn)
 Tootsie Roll Industries (Chicago)
 Vanee Foods (Berkeley)
 Vienna Beef (Chicago)
 Wm. Wrigley Jr. Company (Chicago)
 World's Finest Chocolate (Chicago)

Ingredients
 Bell Flavors & Fragrances (Chicago)
 Ingredion (Westchester)
 Merisant (Chicago)
 Morton Salt (Chicago)
 Urban Accents (Chicago)

Manufacturing
 Archer Daniels Midland (Chicago)
 CF Industries (Deerfield)
 Viskase (Darien)

Restaurant chains

 Amy's Candy Bar (Chicago)
 Argo Tea (Chicago)
 Big Apple Bagels (Deerfield)
 Cake Girls (Chicago)
 Così (Deerfield)
 Flat Out Crazy (Chicago)
 Giordano's Pizzeria
 The Great American Bagel Bakery (Westmont)
 Harold's Chicken Shack (Chicago)
 Heartland Foods (Downers Grove)
 Lettuce Entertain You Enterprises (Chicago)
 Levy Restaurants (Chicago)
 McDonald's (Chicago) 
 Monical's Pizza (Bradley)
 Morton's The Steakhouse (Chicago)
 Portillo's Restaurants (Oakbrook Terrace)
 Potbelly Sandwich Works (Chicago)

Healthcare

Health services
 Cancer Treatment Centers of America (Schaumburg)
 Resurrection Health Care (Chicago)
 Vetsprevail (Chicago)
 Wheaton Franciscan Healthcare (Wheaton)

Pharmaceuticals and medical devices
 Abbott Laboratories (North Chicago)
 Abbvie (Waukegan)
 Astellas Pharma (Northbrook)
 Baxter International (Deerfield)
 Hospira (Lake Forest)
 Marathon Pharmaceuticals (Chicago)
 Takeda Pharmaceuticals (Deerfield)

Pharmacy
 Caremark Rx (Northbrook)
 Catamaran Corporation (Lisle)
 Walgreens (Deerfield)

Provider goods and services
 Accretive Health (Chicago)
 Allscripts (Chicago)
 Intelligent Medical Objects (Northbrook)
 Medline Industries (Mundelein)
 Stericycle (Lake Forest)

Industrial

Agricultural equipment
 CNH (Burr Ridge)
 Dawn Equipment Company (Sycamore)

Automotive
 Electro-Motive Diesel (McCook)
 Hendrickson Holdings (Lemont; a subsidiary of The Boler Company (Itasca))
 LKQ Corporation (Chicago)
 Raybestos (McHenry)
 Tenneco (Lake Forest)

Building materials
 Amcol (Hoffman Estates)
 USG Corporation (Chicago)

Chemicals
 Stepan Company (Northfield)
 Velsicol Chemical Corporation (Rosemont)

Glass
 Engineered Glass Products (Chicago)
 Thermique Technologies (Chicago)

Metals
 Ecycler (Lake Forest)
 Metal Management (Chicago)
 Ryerson, Inc. (Chicago)

Packaging
 Continental Packaging Solutions (Chicago)
 Packaging Corporation of America (Lake Forest)
 Smurfit-Stone Container (Chicago)

Plumbing and piping
 John Crane Inc. (Morton Grove)
 Sloan Valve Company (Franklin Park)

Tools
 Armstrong Tools (Chicago)
 Ideal Industries (Sycamore)
 Illinois Tool Works (Glenview)

Other

 A and T Recovery (Chicago)
 Cummins Allison (Mount Prospect)
 Dover Corporation (Downers Grove)
 Federal Signal Corporation (Oak Brook)
 The Frantz Manufacturing Company (Chicago)
 IDEX Corporation (Lake Forest)
 JBT Corporation (Chicago)
 Marmon Group (Chicago)
 MSDSonline (Chicago)
 Nalco Holding Company (Naperville)
 Switchcraft (Chicago)
 Tripp Lite (Chicago)
 World Dryer (Berkeley; a subsidiary of Carrier Commercial Refrigeration)

Media and entertainment

Entertainment

 Broadway In Chicago (Chicago)
 Family Video (Glenview)
 Kerasotes Theatres (Chicago)
 Redbox Automated Retail, LLC (Oakbrook Terrace)

Music

 Alligator Records (Chicago)
 Atavistic Records (Chicago)
 Bloodshot Records (Chicago)
 Cedille Records (Chicago)
 Chicago Recording Company (Chicago)
 Criminal IQ Records (Chicago)
 Delmark Records (Chicago)
 Drag City (Chicago)
 Earwig Music Company (Chicago)
 Epitonic (Chicago)
 Eye of the Storm Records (Country Club Hills)
 Flying Fish Records (Chicago)
 Get Money Gang Entertainment (Chicago)
 Glitch Mode Recordings (Chicago)
 Hefty Records (Chicago)
 Invisible Records (Chicago)
 Johann's Face Records (Chicago)
 Lengua Armada Discos (Chicago)
 Lo-Fidelity Records (Naperville)
 Minty Fresh (Chicago)
 Positron! Records (Chicago)
 Sick Room Records (Chicago)
 Thick Records (Chicago)
 Thrill Jockey (Chicago)
 Touch and Go Records (Chicago)
 Victory Records (Chicago)

Online

 Channel Awesome (Lombard)
 College Football News (Chicago)
 Consequence of Sound (Chicago)
 HighBeam Research (Chicago)
 Jellyvision (Chicago)
 Legacy.com (Evanston)
 MuggleNet (LaPorte)
 Newsweb Corporation (Chicago)
 The Onion (Chicago)
 Pitchfork Media (Chicago)

Publishing

 22nd Century Media (Orland Park)
 Academy Chicago Publishers (Chicago)
 Allured Business Media (Carol Stream)
 American Technical Publishers (Orland Park)
 Carus Publishing Company (Chicago)
 Chicago Reader (Chicago)
 Daily Herald (Arlington Heights)
 Desplaines Valley News (Summit)
 Farm Progress (St. Charles)
 Good News Publishers (Wheaton)
 Goodheart–Willcox (Tinley Park)
 Haymarket Books (Chicago)
 Johnson Publishing Company (Chicago)
 Metromix (Chicago)
 Northwestern University Press (Evanston)
 Open Court Publishing Company (Chicago)
 Pink (Chicago)
 RR Donnelley (Chicago)
 Sourcebooks (Naperville)
 Star Farm Productions (Chicago)
 Sun-Times Media Group (Chicago)
 Third World Press (Chicago)
 Tribune Company (Chicago)
 Tyndale House (Carol Stream)
 University of Chicago Press (Chicago)
 Venture (Chicago)
 Wrapports (Chicago)

TV, film, and radio

 Barrington Broadcasting (Hoffman Estates)
 Big Ten Network (Chicago)
 Fensler Films (Chicago)
 Graham Media Group (Chicago)
 Harpo Productions (Chicago)
 KM Communications Inc. (Skokie)
 Midway Broadcasting Corporation (Chicago)
 Moody Radio (Chicago)
 MPI Home Video (Orland Park)
 NBC Sports Chicago (Chicago)
 Oprah Winfrey Network (Chicago)
 The Second City (Chicago)
 Siskel/Jacobs Productions (Chicago)
 Standing Point Films (Chicago)
 Tribune Broadcasting (Chicago)
 Weigel Broadcasting (Chicago)
 WGN America (Chicago)

Professional and business services

Accounting
 Baker Tilly Virchow Krause, LLP (Chicago)
 Crowe LLP (Chicago)
 Grant Thornton LLP (Oakbrook Terrace)
 RSM US (Chicago)

Design
 Design Museum of Chicago (Chicago)
 Product Development Technologies (Lake Zurich)

Legal

 Baker & McKenzie (Chicago)
 Banner & Witcoff (Chicago)
 Bartlit Beck Herman Palenchar & Scott (Chicago)
 BDO USA, LLP (Chicago)
 Edelson McGuire (Chicago)
 Fitch, Even, Tabin & Flannery (Chicago)
 Goldberg Weisman Cairo (Chicago)
 Hinshaw & Culbertson LLP (Chicago)
 Horwitz Horwitz & Associates (Chicago)
 Jenner & Block (Chicago)
 Katten Muchin Rosenman (Chicago)
 Kirkland & Ellis (Chicago)
 Locke Lord (Chicago)
 Masuda Funai (Chicago)
 Mayer Brown (Chicago)
 McAndrews, Held & Malloy (Chicago)
 McDermott Will & Emery (Chicago)
 People's Law Office (Chicago)
 Schiff Hardin (Chicago)
 Seyfarth Shaw (Chicago)
 Sidley Austin (Chicago)
 Winston & Strawn (Chicago)

Management consulting
 A.T. Kearney (Chicago)
 Accenture (Chicago)
 Boston Consulting Group (Chicago)
 Huron Consulting Group (Chicago)
 McKinsey (Chicago)
 Navigant Consulting, Inc. (Chicago)

Marketing and public relations

 360i (Chicago)
 A. Eicoff & Company (Chicago)
 AKPD Message and Media (Chicago)
 All By Students (ABS) Notebooks (Chicago)
 Burrell Communications Group (Chicago)
 Centro Inc (Chicago)
 Cramer-Krasselt (Chicago)
 Draftfcb (Chicago)
 Edelman (Chicago)
 Epsilon (Chicago)
 Havas (Chicago)
 IP Pixel (Chicago)
 IRI (Chicago)
 Laughlin Constable (Chicago)
 Leo Burnett Worldwide (Chicago)
 Plan B Advertising Agency (Chicago)
 Public Communications Inc. (Chicago)
 Roundarch Isobar (Chicago)
 Shareasale (Chicago)
 ShopLocal (Chicago)
 Someoddpilot (Chicago)
 Starcom (Chicago)
 Strata (Chicago)
 Whittman-Hart (Chicago)

Recruiting, human resources and payroll
 Aon Hewitt (Lincolnshire)
 Challenger, Gray & Christmas (Chicago)
 Heidrick & Struggles (Chicago)
 Paylocity Corporation (Schaumburg)
 Spencer Stuart (Chicago)
 SurePayroll (Glenview)

Technology consulting
 Forsythe Technology (Skokie)

Technology

Distribution
 Anixter (Glenview)

Hardware

 Andrew Corporation (Westchester)
 Callpod (Chicago)
 Convia (Buffalo Grove)
 Neuros Technology (Chicago)
 Newark Corporation (Chicago)
 Shure (Niles)
 Victor Technology (Bolingbrook)
 Zebra Technologies (Vernon Hills)
 Zenith Electronics (Lincolnshire; a subsidiary of South Korea-based LG Electronics)

Internet

 CareerBuilder (Chicago)
 Cars.com (Chicago)
 CheapTickets (Chicago)
 crowdSPRING (Chicago)
 Groupon (Chicago)
 GrubHub (Chicago)
 Orbitz (Chicago)
 Orderzone.com (Chicago)
 ParkWhiz (Chicago)
 Peapod (Skokie)
 ProLockbox LLC (Evanston)
 SilkRoad (Chicago)
 Sittercity.com (Chicago)
 SpotHero (Chicago)
 TicketsNow (Rolling Meadows)
 UBid (Chicago)
 Vivid Seats (Chicago)

Manufacturing
 Littelfuse (Chicago)
 Molex (Lisle)
 S&C Electric (Chicago)

Services
 Adar, Inc (Chicago)
HALOCK (Schaumburg)
 LiveWatch Security (Evanston)
 Translate.com (Chicago)
 Trustwave Holdings (Chicago)
 Underwriters Laboratories (Northbrook)
XL.net (Chicago)

Software

 Adeptia (Chicago)
 Basecamp (Chicago)
 BigMachines (Deerfield)
 CDK Global (Hoffman Estates)
 Cleversafe (Chicago)
 Computhink (Lombard)
 Davka (Chicago)
 Dieselpoint, Inc. (Chicago)
 Donnelley Financial Solutions (Chicago)
 Fieldglass (Chicago)
 Flexera Software (Schaumburg)
 John Galt Solutions, Inc. (Chicago)
 Kleinschmidt Inc (Deerfield)
 Latigent (Chicago)
 Nextpoint (Chicago)
 OneSpan (Chicago)
 Open Kernel Labs (Chicago; acquired by General Dynamics)
 Passport Software (Northfield)
 RemObjects Software (Hanover Park)
 Springcm (Chicago)
 ThoughtWorks (Chicago)
 Univa (Lisle)

Telecommunications and networking

 Aircell (Itasca)
 CacheFly (Chicago)
 Gogo Inflight Internet (Itasca)
 Hostway (Chicago)
 Looking Glass Networks (Oak Brook)
 Motorola Mobility (Chicago)
 Motorola Solutions (Schaumburg)
 Novarra Inc. (Itasca)
 ServerCentral (Chicago)
 Steadfast Networks (Chicago)
 Telephone and Data Systems (Chicago)
 Tellabs (Naperville)
 U.S. Cellular (Chicago)
 USRobotics (Schaumburg)
 Westell (Aurora)

Video games

 American Sammy (Chicago)
 Babaroga (Chicago)
 Day 1 Studios (Chicago)
 Incredible Technologies (Vernon Hills)
 Iron Galaxy Studios (Chicago)
 Jellyvision Games (Chicago)
 Mountain King Studios (Chicago)
 Namco Cybertainment (Bensenville; a subsidiary of Japan-based Namco)
 NetherRealm Studios (Chicago)
 Robomodo (Chicago)
 WMS Industries (Waukegan)

Travel and transportation

Aviation support
 AAR Corporation (Wood Dale)
 Boeing (Chicago)
 Covenant Aviation Security (Chicago)
 Jet Support Services, Inc. (Chicago)

Consumer travel

 Caravan Tours (Chicago)
 CheapTickets (Chicago)
 Chicago Trolley Company (Chicago)
 Hyatt (Chicago)
 Kokua Hospitality, LLC (Chicago)
 Orbitz (Chicago)
 United Airlines Holdings (Chicago)

Freight
 Hub Group (Oak Brook)
 Livingston International (Chicago)

Rail

 Anacostia Rail Holdings Company (Chicago)
 Chicago Union Station Company (Chicago)
 FreightCar America (Chicago)
 GATX (Chicago)
 GE Transportation (Chicago)
 Iowa Pacific Holdings (Chicago)
 Rail World (Chicago)
 Transco Railway Products (Chicago)
 TTX Company (Chicago)
 Union Tank Car Company (Chicago)

Road

 Donlen Corporation (Northbrook)
 Durham School Services (Warrenville)
 Motor Coach Industries (Schaumburg)
 National Van Lines, Inc. (Broadview)
 Navistar International (Lisle)
 ParkWhiz (Chicago)
 SpotHero (Chicago)
 Standard Parking (Chicago)
 Yellow Cab Company (Chicago)

Services
 American Hotel Register Company (Vernon Hills)

Out of state and foreign companies with a major presence
There are other large corporations with an established presence in Chicago and/or its suburbs (but whose corporate headquarters are located elsewhere), including:

Autos

 BMW of North America Central Region Office (Schaumburg) (from Munich, Germany)
 Continental Automotive Systems (Temic) (Deer Park) (from Hanover, Germany)
 Ford Motor Company (Chicago Assembly, Chicago Heights Stamping) (from Detroit, Michigan, US)
 Hyundai Motor Company (Aurora) (from Seoul, South Korea)
 Nissan Forklift (Marengo) (from Yokohama, Japan)
 Nissan North America (Aurora) (from Yokohama, Japan)
 Subaru of America Regional Office - Central (Itasca) (from Tokyo, Japan)
 Toyota Motor Sales, U.S.A., Inc. (Aurora, Naperville) (from Toyota, Japan)

Consumer

 Bridgestone (Bridgestone Retail Operations, LLC) (Bloomingdale) (from Tokyo, Japan)
 Dyson USA (Chicago) (from Malmesbury, UK)
 Li-Ning (Chicago) (from Beijing, China)
 Medela (McHenry) (from Baar, Switzerland)
 Sunstar Americas (Schaumburg) (from Osaka, Japan)
 thinkorswim (Chicago) (from New York, New York, US)
 Valspar (from Minneapolis, Minnesota, US)

Energy
 BP (Warrenville, Naperville, Whiting) (from London, UK)
 Citgo (Lemont Refinery) (from Houston, Texas, US)
 Schneider Electric (Palatine) (from Rueil-Malmaison, France)

Financial services

 ABN AMRO Clearing (Chicago) (from Amsterdam, Netherlands)
 Aon Corporation Americas region headquarters (Chicago) (from London, UK)
 Bank of America (from Charlotte, North Carolina, US)
 BMO Harris Bank (Chicago), a subsidiary of Montreal-based Bank of Montreal
 Capital One (Rolling Meadows) (from Tysons Corner, Virginia, US)
 Experian (Schaumburg) (from Dublin, Ireland)
 Fitch Group (from New York, New York, US and London, UK)
 JPMorgan Chase (See: Bank One Corporation) (from New York, New York, US)
 Popular, Inc. (Banco Popular North America) (Rosemont) (from San Juan, PR, US)
 UBS (from Zürich, Switzerland)
 Willis Group (Chicago - Willis Tower) (from London, UK)
 XL Group (Chicago, Schaumburg) (from Dublin, Ireland)
 Zurich Financial Services (Schaumburg) (from Zürich, Switzerland)

Food, beverages and agriculture

 Ajinomoto (Ajinomoto Food Ingredients LLC & Ajinomoto Heartland LLC) (Chicago) (from Tokyo, Japan)
 Barilla Americas HQ (Northbrook) (from Parma, Italy)
 Butterball (Naperville) (from Garner, North Carolina, US)
 Cargill (Chicago, Hammond) (from Minnetonka, Minnesota, US)
 ConAgra Foods (Naperville) (from Omaha, Nebraska, US)
 Maple Leaf Foods (Des Plaines) (from Toronto, Ontario, Canada)
 Richelieu Foods (Elk Grove Village) (from Randolph, Massachusetts, US)
 Smithfield Foods (Armour-Eckrich Meats LLC) (Lisle and St. Charles) (from Smithfield, Virginia, US)

Healthcare and pharmaceuticals

 Astellas US LLC (Northbrook) (from Tokyo, Japan)
 Fresenius Kabi USA (Lake Zurich) (from Bad Homburg, Germany)
 Fujifilm Medical (Hanover Park) (from Tokyo, Japan)
 LifeWatch (Rosemont) (from Neuhausen am Rheinfall, Switzerland)
 McKesson Corporation (Wheeling) (from New York, New York, US)
 Siemens Healthcare U.S. headquarters (Deerfield) (from Munich, Germany)
 Takeda Pharmaceutical Company U.S. headquarters (Deerfield) (from Osaka, Japan)

Industrial

 AkzoNobel (Polymer Chemicals Unit) (from Amsterdam, Netherlands)
 Amada Co (Amada Machine Tools America) (Schaumburg) (from Kanagawa, Japan)

Amcor Flexibles from Seitzerland
 ArcelorMittal (U.S. headquarters in Chicago; plants in Riverdale, East Chicago, and Burns Harbor) (from Luxembourg)
 Bystronic North America headquarters (Elgin) (from Niederönz, Switzerland)
 Caterpillar Inc. (from Peoria, Illinois, US)
 General Electric (from Schenectady, New York, US)
 Gerdau (plant in Joliet)
 Ineos/Innovene (Chicago, Naperville, Whiting) (from Rolle, Switzerland)
 James Hardie Industries U.S. headquarters (Chicago) (from Australia)
 Komatsu Limited U.S. headquarters (Rolling Meadows) (from Tokyo, Japan)
 Lafarge North America headquarters (Rosemont) (from Paris, France)
 Makino (Elgin) (from Tokyo, Japan)
 Mazak Midwest Technology Center (Schaumburg) (from Ōguchi, Japan)
 Misumi U.S. headquarters (Schaumburg) (from Tokyo, Japan)
 Mori Seiki U.S. headquarters (Hoffman Estates) (from Nagoya, Japan)
 Noritake (Arlington Heights) (from Nagoya, Japan)
 Rexam (Chicago, Buffalo Grove) (from London, UK)
 Ricardo plc (Burr Ridge) (from Shoreham-by-Sea, UK)
 Robert Bosch Corp. (Broadview (automotive aftermarket), Mount Prospect (production tools), Hoffman Estates (Bosch Rexroth)) (from Gerlingen, Germany)
 Rockwell Automation (Burr Ridge) (from Milwaukee, Wisconsin, US)
 Ryobi (Chicago) (from Hiroshima, Japan)
 Siemens Building Technologies U.S. headquarters (Buffalo Grove) (from Munich, Germany)
 SSAB North America (Lisle) (from Stockholm, Sweden)
 Subaru Industrial Power Products (Robin) (Lake Zurich) (from Tokyo, Japan)
 Sumitomo Corporation of America (Rosemont) (from Tokyo, Japan)
 Suzo Happ North America HQ (Elk Grove Village) (from Rotterdam, Netherlands)
 Tyco International (Tyco Electrical & Metal Products) (Harvey) (from Princeton, New Jersey, US)
 U.S. Steel (Gary Works) (Gary) (from Pittsburgh, Pennsylvania, US)
 Wanxiang Group U.S. headquarters (Elgin) (from Hangzhou, China
 Weichai Power (Rolling Meadows) (from Weifang, China
 Yaskawa Electric Corporation (Waukegan) (from Kitakyushu, Japan)
 ZF Friedrichshafen (Vernon Hills) (from Friedrichshafen, Germany)

Media
 ACNielsen North America HQ (Schaumburg) (from New York, New York, US)
 McGraw-Hill (Chicago) (from New York, New York, US)
 Pearson Education, publishing as Scott Foresman (Glenview) (from London, UK)

Professional services
 Acxiom (Downers Grove) (from Little Rock, Arkansas, US) 
 Cision US HQ (Chicago) (from Stockholm, Sweden)
 Colliers International Midwest HQ (Chicago & Rosemont) (from Seattle)
 DigitasLBi (Chicago) (from New York City)
 Mintel (Chicago) (from London, UK)
 Paychex (Naperville) (from Penfield, New York, US)

Technology

 Affiliated Computer Services (ACS) (Schaumburg) (from Dallas, Texas, US)
 Alcatel-Lucent (from Paris, France)
 Amazon, Amazon Web Services
 AT&T Inc. (from Dallas, Texas, US)
 Canon USA (Itasca) (from Tokyo, Japan)
 Cognizant (Chicago, Lisle) (from Teaneck, New Jersey, US)
 FANUC (Hoffman Estates) (from Yamanashi, Japan)
 Google (Chicago) (from Mountain View, California)
 Hitachi High Technologies America (Schaumburg) (from Tokyo, Japan)
 Huawei (Rolling Meadows) (from Shenzhen, China)
 IBM (from Armonk, New York, US)
 Microsoft (Chicago, Downers Grove, Northlake (data center)) (from Redmond, Washington, US)
 Mitsubishi Electric (Mitsubishi Electric Automation, Inc.) (Vernon Hills) (from Tokyo, Japan)
 Mitutoyo (Aurora) (from Kawasaki, Japan)
 NEC (NEC Display Solutions) (Itasca) (from Tokyo, Japan)
 Nortel (Schaumburg) (from Mississauga, Canada)
 Northrop Grumman Electronic Systems (Rolling Meadows) (from Falls Church, Virginia, US)
 OMRON (Schaumburg, Bannockburn, St. Charles) (from Kyoto, Japan)
 Panasonic Factory Solutions Company of America (Rolling Meadows, Buffalo Grove) (from Osaka, Japan)
 PayPal (Chicago) (from San Jose, California)
 PC Connection (Itasca) (from Merrimack, New Hampshire)
 Salesforce.com (Chicago) (from San Francisco, California)
 SAP SE (Chicago, Downers Grove) (from Walldorf, Germany)
 STMicroelectronics (Schaumburg) (from Geneva, Switzerland)
 TopstepTrader
 Toshiba America (Arlington Heights, Buffalo Grove, Chicago, Rolling Meadows) (from Tokyo, Japan)
 Uber (Chicago) (from San Francisco, California, US)
 Yelp (Chicago) (from San Francisco, California, US)

Travel and transportation
 American Airlines (Hub at O'Hare International Airport) (from Fort Worth, Texas, US)
 APL Logistics (Oak Brook) (from Singapore)
 CSX Transportation (Northern Region Operations Center) (Calumet City) (from Jacksonville, Florida, US)
 Southwest Airlines (Hub at Chicago Midway International Airport) (from Dallas, Texas, US)
 UPS (Chicago Area Consolidation Hub) (Hodgkins) (from Sandy Springs, Georgia, US)

See also
 List of Illinois companies

References

Chicago-related lists

Chicago Metropolitan Area